Yury Nikolaevitch Voronov (1 June 1874 in Tiflis – 10 December 1931 in Leningrad) was a Russian botanist. He worked at the Botanical Garden in Leningrad.

Alternative transcriptions of his name into the Latin alphabet include Jurij Nikolaewitch Woronow, as seen at the International Plant Names Index database.

Between 1907 and 1919, he published Opredelitel rastenij Kavkaza i Kryma (1907-1919) with Aleksandr Vasiljevich Fomin, about plant species in the Caucasus.

References

Notes
 
 
 

Soviet botanists
19th-century botanists from the Russian Empire
1874 births
1931 deaths